Nova Kasaba (Cyrillic: Hoвa Кacaбa) is a small town in the northeastern part of Bosnia and Herzegovina. This town is located on the main route between Belgrade and Sarajevo along the banks of River Jadar. The town was settled around Musa-Paša Mosque (1643) which was proclaimed a National Monument in 1951.

History
The first mention of this town can be traced back to the year of 1641, when Kara Musa Pasha, the Turkish Grand Vizier, asked for a permission to build a mosque and Han (Caravanserai) in the Bosnian Sanjak Municipality, Birač district in the vicinity of the Gojković village. The argument was that Han existed there but it got burned so daily travelers were forced to use local housing for rest and sleepover. This situation created major issues with locals who were slowly forced out from their homes and eventually most of them moved out from the area. With this argument, Kara Musa-Pasha, was granted the building plan and settlement permit.

The construction begun on 16 September 1641 and was completed on 29 May 1643.

The Proof of this exists in the written archives found in Gazi Husrev-Beg's Library:

- Ferman of Sultan Ibrahim 1051. (7–16 September 1641)

- Kara Musa-Pasha endowment 1053. (20–29 May 1643)

Sport
The town is home to F.K. Jadar Football Team that is currently playing in Područna liga RS - Birač.

Srebrenica genocide
Nova Kasaba is also a site connected to the 1995 Srebrenica genocide, in which approximately 8,000 Bosniaks were killed by the Army of Republika Srpska. Several military leaders, including General Krstic, have been convicted for the massacre by the International Criminal Tribunal for the former Yugoslavia.

Demographics

1991
Population total: 1042

 Muslims/Bosniaks - 814 (78.12%)
 Others - 141 (13.53%)
 Serbs - 76 (7.29%)
 Yugoslavs - 11 (1.06%)

Now
Small numbers of people have returned to this town, approximately 50–100 people, which represents 5–10% of the original pre-war population.

See also

References

Cities and towns in Republika Srpska
Populated places in Milići, Republika Srpska